Horace Knight (fl. 1901–1920) was a natural history illustrator with the British Museum, noted particularly for his images in The Moths of the British Isles by Richard South.

Biography
Knight, who lived at 16 Dafforne Road, Upper Tooting, had a son, Edgar S. Knight, who also illustrated. Horace Knight retired from the British Museum in 1917 due to illness, at which point he had been producing drawings for William Lucas Distant for over 30 years, working for the chromo-lithographers and letter-press printers, West, Newman & Co. of Hatton Garden.

Horace and his brother E. C. Knight worked together at West, Newman & Co.

His work appeared in 
John Henry Leech/Richard South: Butterflies from China, Japan and Corea, Transactions of the Entomological Society of London 1901
Charles Thomas Bingham: The Fauna of British India, Including Ceylon and Burma: Butterflies 1905-7
William Lucas Distant: Insecta Transvaaliensia 1924
William John Stokoe ed.: The Observer's Book of British Butterflies 1969

His collaborators were entomologist Carl Plötz, artist Alice Ellen Prout and entomologist Humphrey Drummond Swain.

References

Natural history illustrators
19th-century births
20th-century deaths
English illustrators
People associated with the Natural History Museum, London
People from Tooting